Alex Blake (born 1951) is an American post-bop jazz double-bassist and electric bass guitarist.

Alex Blake may also refer to:

Alex Blake (cricketer) (born 1989), English professional cricketer
Alex Blake (Criminal Minds), fictional character
Alex Blake (actor), British actor who plays Zayan Scott in EastEnders

See also
Alexander Blake (disambiguation)